The following is a list of prominent Indo-Guyanese people.

Notable Indo-Guyanese

Politics 

 Irfaan Ali, President of Guyana
 Waheed Alli, Baron Alli, life peer in the British House of Lords
 Shaik Baksh, Minister of Education
 Isahak Basir, Member of Parliament
 Vickram Bharrat, politician
 Ranji Chandisingh, former Vice President of Guyana
 Ronald Gajraj, politician
 Cheddi Jagan, former President of Guyana, dentist, and the Father of the Nation
 Bharrat Jagdeo, Vice President of Guyana, former President of Guyana, and former Prime Minister of Guyana
 Syed Kamall,  British MEP for London 2005 - 2019
 Edward Luckhoo, politician and Governor-General of British Guiana and Acting President of Guyana
 Lionel Luckhoo, politician and lawyer
 Gina Miller, British lawyer who took the UK Government to court over its handling of Brexit negotiations
 Manzoor Nadir, Speaker of the National Assembly of Guyana
 Moses Nagamootoo, former Prime Minister of Guyana 
 Sase Narain, former Speaker of the National Assembly of Guyana
 Shiw Sahai Naraine, former Vice President of Guyana and engineer
 Reepu Daman Persaud, former Vice President of Guyana and Hindu pandit
 Balram Singh Rai, politician
 Khemraj Ramjattan, former Vice President of Guyana and former Minister of Public Security
 Shridath Ramphal, former Commonwealth Secretary General
Deolatchmee Ramotar, former First Lady of Guyana
 Donald Ramotar, former President of Guyana
 Bishwaishwar Ramsaroop, former Vice President of Guyana
 Peter Ramsaroop, politician
 Kayman Sankar, politician and rice farmer
 Mohamed Shahabuddeen, former Vice President of Guyana and judge
 Doodnauth Singh, former Attorney General of Guyana
 Lutchman Sooknandan, former Director of Public Prosecutions of Belize and Honorary Consul of Guyana in Belize
 Tara Singh Varma,  Dutch politician

Academics 

 David Dabydeen, professor at the University of Warwick and historian
 Clem Seecharan, professor and Caribbean historian
 Bertrand Ramcharan, former UN High Commissioner for Human Rights
 Bishnodat Persaud, professor at the University of the West Indies and former Director of the Commonwealth Secretariat
 Jamal Deen, Distinguished University Professor, McMaster University, Canada.
 Adam Rutherford, Geneticist and science populariser, University College London.

Medicine 

 Deborah Persaud, virologist, named among the world's most influential people in the Time 100 in 2013

Arts and entertainment 
 Raymond Ablack, Canadian actor
 Anjulie, Canadian singer-songwriter
 Gaiutra Bahadur, writer
 Dave Baksh, lead guitarist of the Canadian band Sum 41 (also plays with Brown Brigade)
 Shakira Caine, actress, fashion model, and former Miss Guyana
 Mahadai Das, poet
 Melanie Fiona, Canadian R&B singer-songwriter, who is also of Afro-Guyanese descent
 Rhona Fox, actress
 Terry Gajraj, chutney singer
 Emma Heming, Maltese model
 Harischandra Khemraj, writer
 Laxmi Kallicharan, writer
 Isabella Laughland, British actress
 Avi Nash, American actor
 Priyanka (stage name of Mark Suknanan), Canadian television presenter, drag artist, and winner of Canada's Drag Race Season 1
 Sandhja, Finnish singer
 Melinda Shankar, Canadian actress
 Nandini Sharan, bhajan singer and wife of Hari Om Sharan
 "Princess Anisa" Singh, chutney-soca singer
 Shana Yardan, poet
 Gordon Warnecke,  British actor

Sports 

 Andreas Athanasiou, Canadian NHL player for the Chicago Blackhawks
 Faoud Bacchus, West Indian cricketer
 Shivnarine Chanderpaul, former captain of the West Indies cricket team
 Narsingh Deonarine, West Indian cricketer
 Rohan Kanhai, former captain of the West Indies cricket team
 Alvin Kallicharran, former captain of the West Indies cricket team
 Mahendra Nagamootoo, West Indian cricketer
 Kriskal Persaud, chess player
 Harry Prowell, Marathon Olympian and British West Indies Champion in long-distance running
 Mark Ramprakash, former England cricket player
 Ramnaresh Sarwan, former captain of the West Indies cricket team
 Dhanraj Singh, boxer
 Devendra Bishoo, West Indian cricketer
 Beni Sankar, businessman and former cricket player
 Nezam Hafiz. cricketer and victim of the September 11 attacks
 Paul Stalteri

Religion and philosophy 

 Maya Tiwari, Hindu spiritual teacher
 Shabir Ally, Muslim imam

References

Indo-Guyanese people
Indian diaspora
Indo-Caribbean